Lubny is a city in Poltava Oblast, central Ukraine. Serving as the administrative center of Lubny Raion (district), the city itself is administratively incorporated as a city of oblast significance and does not belong to the raion. Population:

History
Lubny is reputed to be one of the oldest cities in Ukraine, allegedly founded in 988 by knyaz (prince) Vladimir the Great (Volodymyr) of Kyiv. The first written record, however, dates from 1107.

Initially, it was a small wooden fortress above the Sula River. The fortress quickly grew, and in the 15th or 16th century, it was owned by the powerful Wisniowiecki family. The town was ruled by Magdeburg rights and had a coat of arms.

In 1596, Lubny was the site of the last battle of Severyn Nalyvaiko against the Poles. In the 17th century the city was one of the largest in the area. In 1638 it had 2,646 inhabitants.

After Khmelnytsky Uprising, between 1648 and 1781, the town was the headquarters of the Lubny Cossack Regiment.

In 1782 Lubny became an uyezd center of Kiev Viceroyalty, in 1793 the town was included into Malorossiya Governorate, since 1802 - into Poltava Governorate

After a railroad line was constructed through Lubny in 1901, industry grew rapidly and expanded in the city.

A local newspaper has been circulating in the city since July 1917.

During the German occupation in the Second World War, Lubny was the centre of major partisan (resistance) movement. Two Nazi concentration camps were there. On October 16, 1941 over a thousand of the city's Jews, including women and children, were massacred by German Einsatzgruppen on the outskirts of the city. The action, all the way until the execution, was thoroughly documented by photographer Johannes Hähle.

Modern Lubny

Today, Lubny is a large industrial and cultural centre. Many automotive and farm equipment factories were established during the growth of industry between 1901 and the 1930s. As well, Lubny is a major producer of meat and milk products, furniture and bread. Over 40 types of ice cream are made in the milk factorу, and the Lubny bread is known across Ukraine.

Lubny also has its own soccer team, FC Lubny. Several museums and art galleries are located there, and the Lubny institute district is known for the bookstores that carry a wide variety of technical and non-technical books.

A second local newspaper, Visnyk is published in the city since 1994.

The main landmark of the Lubny District is the Mharsky Monastery, with a large six-pillared Ukrainian Baroque cathedral, built in 1684–92 and renovated after a conflagration in 1754, and a neoclassical bell tower, started in 1784 but not completed until 1844.

Monument 
After the demolition of the statue of Lenin, it was replaced by this Ukrainian monument. 

The monument has a text sign in enamel with the following text " My people exist! My people will always be here! No one will abolish my people! ' Vasyl Symonenko, 1962

Administrative divisions
Lubny is divided into eight microdistricts, each raion is governed by a specially-appointed secretary, and has its own branch of the police force. The secretaries are responsible for handling issues in their raion.

Climate

Notable people from Lubny
 Jeremi Wiśniowiecki, Rutheniuan and Polish notable magnate, the father of the future king of Poland Michael I (1612-1651)
 Szymon Syrski, Polish zoologist (1824–1882)
 Kateryna Skarzhynska, philanthropist and collector of folklore (1852-1932) 
 Lyudmila Rudenko, Soviet chess world champion (1904–1986)
 Natalya Meklin, pilot (1922-2005)

References

External links
 Lubny News
 Official city administration site
History of Jewish Community in Lubny
The murder of the Jews of Lubny during World War II, at Yad Vashem website.

 
Cities in Poltava Oblast
Lubensky Uyezd
Kiev Voivodeship
Cossack Hetmanate
Cities of regional significance in Ukraine
Holocaust locations in Ukraine